The  German Steam Locomotive Museum (Deutsches Dampflokomotiv-Museum) or DDM is located at the foot of the famous Schiefe Ebene ramp on the Ludwig South-North Railway in Neuenmarkt, Upper Franconia. This region is in northern Bavaria, Germany. The DDM was founded in 1977.

Facilities 

The museum is in the former locomotive shed (Bahnbetriebswerk) at Neuenmarkt-Wirsberg station. It comprises a 15-road roundhouse, water cranes, a turntable with an off-centre pivot, a coaling facility and a Ruge coal crane in a newly built 'old fashioned' working coal yard.

History 

The locomotive shed was built in 1895 by the Royal Bavarian State Railways and extended in 1923 by the Deutsche Reichsbahn. Amongst others, pusher locomotives e. g. DRG Class 95s (ex-Prussian T 20s) and Class 96s (ex-Bavarian Gt 2x4/4 Mallet locomotives) were stationed there. One example of a Class 95 may be seen in the museum.

Locomotives 

Around 30 steam locomotives may be seen, including a Bavarian S 3/6 express engine, a Bavarian PtL 2/2 (a tiny tank engine known as the Glaskasten, literally: 'glass box', the only complete surviving member of its class), a  Prussian P 8 passenger train engine and a Saxon XIV HT. Deutsche Reichsbahn locomotives represented include Class 01, 03, 44, 50, 64,  and 86 engines and there are Deutsche Bundesbahn Class 10 and 23 locomotives, as well as industrial engines. In addition there is a museum-owned narrow-gauge line on the land which is worked by steam and diesel locomotives. An electric express train locomotive, the DB Class 103, may temporarily be seen in the DDM as a museum locomotive.

Photos 
Except where stated, all locomotives depicted belong to the DDM.

Other exhibits 

Various steam locomotive parts are also displayed, such as the smokebox, wheelset and cylinder block from locomotive number 18 610 (S 3/6) as well as the sectioned boiler from a Prussian G 8. Other exhibits of railway history include a steam crane, a saloon coach from Adolf Hitler's special train that was used in 1955 by German chancellor, Konrad Adenauer, on his historic visit to Moscow, a snow plough, a dining car and a historical telegraph station.

In addition there is a large model railway layout (Theme: the Schiefe Ebene).

Also from engine number 18 610 is its tender which is coupled to 18 612.

Railway operations 
The museum runs trips over the Schiefe Ebene during the summer from Neuenmarkt-Wirsberg to Marktschorgast and the Mönchshof Brewery at Kulmbach. A Class 796 Uerdingen railbus is stabled at the museum for these services and steam locomotives are also employed.

See also
 History of rail transport in Germany
 Royal Bavarian State Railways
 Deutsche Reichsbahn
 Deutsche Bundesbahn
 Schiefe Ebene

References

External links 
 http://www.dampflokmuseum.de DDM home page
 http://www.mytrains.at/deutsches_dampflokomotiv_museum.htm Private site about the DDM
 Bavarian section of lokomotive-online.com

Railway museums in Germany
Heritage railways in Germany
Railway museums in Bavaria